Aspitates forbesi is a species of geometrid moth in the family Geometridae. It is found in North America.

The MONA or Hodges number for Aspitates forbesi is 6716.

References

Further reading

 

Angeronini
Articles created by Qbugbot
Moths described in 1963